"Eu cred" (English: "I believe") is a song recorded by Romanian singer Mălina Olinescu. It was recorded at the TVR Music Studio in Bucharest, and was released as a CD single in 1998 by Mega Music in Romania. The release also contained "You Live", the English-language version of the song.

The track represented  in the Eurovision Song Contest 1998 in Birmingham, United Kingdom after winning the pre-selection show Selecția Națională. In Birmingham, Romania automatically qualified to the final due to their relegation in the previous year and finished in 22nd place with six points. This remains one of Romania's worst results ever in the contest. Commercially, "Eu cred" failed to impact any national chart.

Background and release
"Eu cred" was written by Liliana Ștefan, while production was handled by Adrian Romcescu. It was recorded by Mălina Olinescu at the TVR Music Studio in Bucharest, Romania, and engineered by Dani Constantin. Olinescu had previously risen to significant fame in Romania after competing in native TV music show  in 1996. A CD single of "Eu cred" was released in 1998 by Mega Music in Romania, containing "You Live", the English-language version of the track, on its B-side. The CD came with a booklet featuring lyrics to both versions. Adrian Ștefănescu was credited for artists and repertoire (A&R) services.

At Eurovision
On 14 March 1998, the Selecția Națională was held in order to select the Romanian entrant for the Eurovision Song Contest 1998. Subsequently, "Eu cred" was chosen after the votes of four regional jury panels, an expert jury panel and televoting results were combined; Olinescu had come second with the televotes. The Eurovision Song Contest 1998 took place at the Arena Birmingham in Birmingham, United Kingdom and consisted of the final on 9 May 1998. According to the then-Eurovision rules, selected countries were picked to participate in the final, including the host country. Her show used orchestral accompaniment conducted by maestro Romcescu. Romania eventually came in 22nd position with six points awarded by Israel, which remains one of the country's lowest placements ever in the contest.

Track listing
Romanian CD single
"Eu cred" – 3:03
"You Live" – 3:00

Credits and personnel
Credits adapted from the liner notes of the CD single.

Management
Published by Mega Music
Recorded at Studioul muzical al TVR (Bucharest, Romania)

Personnel
Mălina Olinescu – lead vocals
Dani Constantin – engineer
Adrian Romcescu – producer
Liliana Ștefan – composer
Adrian Ștefănescu – artists and repertoire (A&R)

Release history

References

1998 songs
Eurovision songs of 1998
Eurovision songs of Romania
Romanian songs